Lancs may refer to:

 Lancashire, an English county
 Lancs Industries, a manufacturer of safety equipment
 Duke of Lancaster's Regiment, an infantry regiment of the British Army

See also 
 Lanc (disambiguation)